J.  C. Hendee is an American author. With his wife Barb Hendee, he is author of The Saga of the Noble Dead, the fantasy novel series.

List of works

Saga of the Noble Dead

series one:
 Mass market trilogy
 Dhampir (2003) with Barb Hendee
 Thief of Lives (2004) with Barb Hendee
 Sister of the Dead (2005) with Barb Hendee
 Hardcover trilogy
 Traitor to the Blood (2006) with Barb Hendee
 Rebel Fay (2007) with Barb Hendee
 Child of a Dead God (2008) with Barb Hendee

series two:
 In Shade and Shadow (2009) with Barb Hendee
 Through Stone and Sea (2010) with Barb Hendee
 Of Truth and Beasts (2011) with Barb Hendee

series three:
 Between Their Worlds (2012)  with Barb Hendee
 The Dog in the Dark (2012) with Barb Hendee
 A Wind in the Night (2014) with Barb Hendee

sidestories:
 Bones of the Earth
 Karras the Kitten (May 2012) 
 Karras the Cat (October 2012)
 Sagecraft
 Puppy Love (June 2013)

spin-offs:
 Codex of the Noble Dead (planned)

References

External links
 Noble Dead official website
 Bibliography at SciFan
 

21st-century American novelists
American fantasy writers
American male novelists
Living people
21st-century American male writers
Year of birth missing (living people)